This list deals with association football rivalries around Africa among clubs. This includes local derbies as well as matches between teams further afield. For rivalries between international teams and club rivalries around the world, see List of association football rivalries.

Only clubs of federations which are members of CAF are included. The article is alphabetically split into CAF member zones: CECAFA (East), COSAFA (South), UNAF (North), UNIFFAC (Central) and WAFU-UFOA (West).

Clubs in CECAFA

Ethiopia
 Sheger derby: Ethiopian Coffee Sport Club vs Saint George S.C.

Kenya
Mashemeji Derby: A.F.C. Leopards vs. Gor Mahia
 Naivasha derby: Karuturi Sports vs. Oserian F.C.

Rwanda
 Rubavu derby: Etincelles F.C. vs. Marines F.C.
 Rwandan derby: Rayon Sports F.C. vs. APR FC

Sudan
 Omdurman derby: Al-Hilal Club vs. Al-Merreikh SC

Tanzania
 Dar es Salaam derby: Yanga vs. Simba SC

Clubs in COSAFA

Angola 
 Dérbi do Povo: Petro Atlético vs. Primeiro de Agosto
 Dérbi de Luanda: Interclube vs. Petro de Luanda
 Dérbi das Lundas: Progresso da Lunda Sul vs. Sagrada Esperança

Botswana
 Gaborone Derby: Gaborone United vs. Township Rollers vs. Notwane FC
 Francistown Derby: ECCO City Greens vs. TAFIC
 Lobatse Derby: BMC vs. Extension Gunners
 Selebi-Phikwe Derby: Nico United vs. Satmos

Eswatini 
 Mbabane derby: Mbabane Highlanders vs. Mbabane Swallows
 Forces derby: Royal Leopards vs. Green Mamba
 Manzini derby: Manzini Wanderers vs. Moneni Pirates

Lesotho
  Derby: Bantu F.C. vs. Lioli F.C.

Namibia
Fighters-Stars rivalry: African Stars vs. Life Fighters
Katutura derby: Black Africa vs. Orlando Pirates Windhoek
Walvis Bay derby: Blue Waters vs. Eleven Arrows F.C.

South Africa
 Soweto derby: Kaizer Chiefs vs. Orlando Pirates.
 Cape Town Derby: Cape Town Spurs vs. Cape Town City
 Free State Derby: Bloemfontein Celtic vs. Free State Stars
 Limpopo Derby: Dynamos vs. Black Leopards
 Tshwane Derby: Mamelodi Sundowns vs. SuperSport United
 Durban Derby: AmaZulu vs. Golden Arrows as Amazulu FC and Golden Arrow (abafana besthende) are from the same province, this sparked a derby since the 1970s/1980s between the two teams, sometimes the derby is called the Zulu or Natal derby.

Zambia
 Kitwe derby: Power Dynamos vs. Nkana F.C.
 Ndola derby: Zesco United vs. Forest Rangers
 Lusaka derby: Zanaco F.C. vs. Lusaka Dynamos vs. Red Arrows F.C.
 Copperbelt derby: Power Dynamos or Nkana F.C. vs. Zesco United

Zimbabwe
 Harare Derby: CAPS United vs. Dynamos FC
 Bulawayo Derby: Highlanders vs. Zimbabwe Saints
 Battle of Zimbabwe: Highlanders vs. Dynamos FC
 Battle of the Cities: CAPS United vs. Highlanders
 Midlands Derby: Lancashire Steel vs. Shabanie Mine

Clubs in UNAF

Algeria
Algiers derby: MC Algiers vs. USM Algiers
Algerian Clasico: MC Algiers vs. JS Kabylie
Kabylie derby: JS Kabylie vs. JSM Béjaïa or MO Béjaïa
 Derby of Oran: MC Oran vs. ASM Oran
 Derby of Constantine: CS Constantine vs. MO Constantine
 Derby of Skikda: JSM Skikda vs. ES Collo
 Derby of Annaba: USM Annaba vs. Hamra Annaba
 Derby de La Mitidja: USM Blida vs. WA Boufarik vs. RC Arbaa
JS Kabylie-ES Sétif rivalry: JS Kabylie vs. ES Sétif
Derby de la Soummam: JSM Béjaïa vs. MO Béjaïa
East derby: ES Sétif vs CS Constantine

Egypt
 Cairo Derby: Al Ahly vs. Zamalek SC
 Canal Derby: Ismaily SC vs. Al-Masry SC
 Ahly-Ismaily rivalry: Al Ahly vs. Ismaily SC
 Al Ahly-Al Masry rivalry: Al Masry vs. Al Ahly
 Al Ahly-Pyramids rivalry: Al Ahly vs. Pyramids FC
 Zamalek-Pyramids rivalry: Zamalek SC vs. Pyramids FC
 Alexandria derby: El Ittihad Alexandria vs. Smouha SC
 El Mahalla derby: Ghazl El Mahalla vs. Baladeyet El Mahalla
 Mit Okba derby: Zamalek SC vs. Tersana SC
 Coastal derby: Ittihad Alexandria vs. Ismaily SC
 Mediterranean Classico: Ittihad Alexandria vs. Al Masry SC

Libya
Tripoli derby: Al-Ittihad vs. Al-Ahly
Benghazi derby: Al-Ahly vs. Al-Nasr
Derna derby: Darnes vs. Al-Afriqi
Classico: Al-Ittihad vs. Al-Ahly

Morocco
 Casablanca Derby: Raja CA vs. Wydad AC.
 Moroccan Clasico: Raja CA vs. AS FAR
 Moroccan Clasico: Wydad AC vs. AS FAR
 Rabat Derby: AS FAR vs. FUS Rabat
 Atlas Derby: CODM de Meknès vs. Maghreb de Fès
 Fez Derby: Widad Fez vs. MAS Fez
 North Derby: Moghreb Tetouan vs. Ittihad de Tanger
 Derby de l'oriental: MC Oujda vs. Renaissance Sportive de Berkane
 Amazigh Derby: Chabab Rif Al Hoceima vs. Hassania Agadir

Tunisia
 Tunis derby: Club Africain vs. ES Tunis
 El Classico : Club Africain vs. ES Sahel
 Small Tunis derby: Club Africain vs. Stade Tunisien
 Derby gabésien : Stade Gabèsien vs. AS Gabès.
 Derby du Sahel: ES Sahel vs. US Monastir

Clubs in UNIFFAC

Cameroon
 Yaoundé derby: Canon Yaoundé vs. Tonnerre Yaoundé

Democratic Republic of the Congo
 Kinshasa derby: AS Vita Club vs. Daring Club Motema Pembe

Equatorial Guinea
Clasico Ecuatoguineano: Leones Vegetarianos FC vs. Atletico Semu

Clubs in WAFU-UFOA

Burkina Faso 
 Derby de la Capitale: Étoile Filante vs. ASFA Yennenga

Cape Verde
 Clássico da Capital: Boavista vs. Sporting Praia
 Clássico da Ilha do Aeroporto: Académica do Sal vs. Académico do Aeroporto
 Clássico Mindelense:
Mindelense–Académica rivalry: Académica do Mindelo vs. CS Mindelense
Mindelense–Batuque rivalry: Batuque FC vs. CS Mindelense
Mindelense–Derby rivalry: FC Derby vs. CS Mindelense
 Clássico de São Nicolau: FC Ultramarina vs. SC Atlético

Ghana
Derby of Ghana: Asante Kotoko vs. Hearts of Oak
Kumasi derby: Asante Kotoko vs. King Faisal Babes
Capital city derby: Hearts of Oak vs. Accra Great Olympics

Ivory Coast
Ivorian derby: ASEC Mimosas vs. Africa Sports

Mali
 Grand derby: Djoliba AC vs. Stade Malien
 Bamako derby: Djoliba AC vs. AS Real Bamako

Nigeria
 Jos derby: Any two of Plateau United, Mighty Jets of Jos, and Giwa FC
 Oriental derby: Any two of Enyimba, Enugu Rangers, Heartland F.C. and Ifeanyi Ubah

Sierra Leone
Freetown derby: East End Lions vs. Mighty Blackpool

Togo
 Derby de Sokodé: Semassi vs. Tchaoudjo AC
 Lomé Derbies:
 Derby de Lomé: AS Douanes vs. OC Agaza
Any combinations of these four big teams from the capital city Lomé AS Douanes, AS Togo-Port, Étoile Filante, OC Agaza

References

External links
 FootballDerbies.com
 FIFA.com
 EuroRivals.net – fixtures, results and videos of football derbies
 50 Greatest Rivalries in World Football – Bleacher Report

Africa
Rivalries